The IIFA Best Comedian Award is chosen via a worldwide poll and the winner is announced at the ceremony.

The winners are listed below:

See also 
 IIFA Awards
 Bollywood
 Cinema of India

References

External links 
Official site

International Indian Film Academy Awards